Brasileiros e Brasileiras is a Brazilian telenovela shown in some schedules SBT between November 5, 1990 and May 14, 1991. Writing for the show was done by Carlos Alberto Sofredini and Walter Avancini, who also directed it. The show was a co-production of the Miksom.

Plot

In the São Paulo suburbs, Ângelo is thinking about coming back to practice wrestling. Then, he decides together with Totó to promote a women's wrestling gym, called Duras Na Queda (Hard on the Fall). There that they enter in scene Tereza de Ogum, Alma and Arlete, always surrounded by the Limovi (Liga pela Moral e Virtude-League for the Moral and the Virtue), led by the moralist Coriolano.

Cast

 Edson Celulari.... Totó 
 Fúlvio Stefanini.... Ângelo 
 Carla Camurati.... Catarina 
 Lucélia Santos.... Paula
 Rubens de Falco.... Ramiro Borges 
 Ney Latorraca.... Brás Cubas 
 Daniel Dantas.... Orlando 
 Rosi Campos... Clarisse 
 Walderez de Barros.... Cândida 
 Ana Lúcia Torre.... Clara 
 Marcelo Serrado.... Boca
 Antônio Calloni.... Plinio 
 Isadora Ribeiro.... Tereza de Ogum 
 Mário Cardoso.... Bruno 
 Zezeh Barbosa.... Edilaine 
 Alexandra Marzo.... Alma 
 Andréa Avancini.... de Lourdes 
 Consuelo Leandro.... Tia Ju 
 Jacqueline Laurence.... Antoinette 
 Arlete Montenegro.... Suzana 
 Adilson Branches - Pernambucano 
 Josmar Martins - Vasco 
 Paulo Autran.... Special participation 
 Irene Ravache.... Special participation 
 Juca de Oliveira.... Special participation 
 Fábio Júnior.... Special participation 
 Laerte Morrone.... Coriolano

External links

1990 telenovelas
1990 Brazilian television series debuts
1991 Brazilian television series endings
Brazilian telenovelas
Sistema Brasileiro de Televisão telenovelas
Portuguese-language telenovelas